Monte Albergian is a 3,041 m a.s.l. mountain of the Cottian Alps, located in Italy.
A battalion of 3rd Alpini Regiment, which during World War I earned a Silver Medal of Military Valor, was named after Monte Albergian.

Etymology 
The name Albergian could come from the ancient Celtic population of the Egyans (in Italian Egidini) and could mean High Egyans' mountain (Alberg-Egyan) in their language. Another theory link the name of the mountain the Janus, a Roman solar deity.

Geography 
The mountain is located on a brief ridge heading North which originates from the water divide between Val Chisone and Valle Germanasca. Going South an unnamed saddle at 2,906 m divides Monte Albergian from Monte Gran Miuls (2,974 m a.s.l.), the latter standing on the Germanasca/Chisone water divide.

Administratively the eastern face of the Albergian belongs to the Fenestrelle municipality (comune) and the western one to Pragelato municipality, both in the Metropolitan City of Turin. In clear days its summit, marked by a cross,  offers a great view of Western Alps.

SOIUSA classification 
According to SOIUSA (International Standardized Mountain Subdivision of the Alps) the mountain can be classified in the following way:
 main part = Western Alps
 major sector = North Western Alps
 section = Cottian Alps
 subsection = Alpi del Monginevro
 supergroup = Catena Bucie-Grand Queyron-Orsiera
 group = Gruppo Queyron-Albergian-Sestrière
 subgroup = Sottogruppo Ghinivert-Albergian
 code = I/A-4.II-A.2.b

Access to the summit 
The usual route to Monte Albergian is the waymarked footpath starting from Soucheres Hautes (1,518 m), a frazione (village) of Pragelato municipality. While long (more than 1,500 metres of vertical drop) the route does not require alpine skills. In the Italian scale of hiking difficulty is rated E (Escursionisti, namely suitable for normal hikers). On the WSW ridge of Albergian was described a climbing route of F+ grade.

References

Photo gallery

Maps
 Istituto Geografico Militare (IGM) official maps of Italy, 1:25.000 and 1:100.000 scale, on-line version
 Istituto Geografico Centrale (I.G.C.) - Carta dei sentieri e dei rifugi scala 1:50.000 n. 1 Valli di Susa Chisone e Germanasca

External links 

 

Alpine three-thousanders
Mountains of the Alps
Mountains of Piedmont
Three-thousanders of Italy